Trachelas tranquillus, the broad-faced sac spider, is a species of true spider in the family Trachelidae. It is found in the United States and Canada.

References

External links

 

Trachelidae
Articles created by Qbugbot
Spiders described in 1847